Gary Alan Williams (born 8 June 1963) is an English former footballer who played as a left back in the Football League for Bristol City, Swansea City and Oldham Athletic.

Williams' father, Alan Williams, also played League football.

References

External links

1963 births
Living people
English footballers
Footballers from Bristol
Association football defenders
Association football midfielders
Bristol City F.C. players
Swansea City A.F.C. players
Oldham Athletic A.F.C. players
Bath City F.C. players
English Football League players